I14 or I-14 may refer to:
 Interstate 14, a highway in the U.S. state of Texas
 I14 engine, a type of fourteen-cylinder internal combustion engine
 International 14, a high-performance sailing dinghy
 Hälsinge Regiment, a Swedish Army infantry regiment
 , a submarine of the Imperial Japanese Navy
 Tupolev I-14, Soviet aircraft